Mohammed Adan Saqadhi "dabogale " the people named him "janogale" (born 18 October 1967 ), is Somaliland military official, who’s serving as the Chief of Somaliland Police Force.

See also

 Somaliland Police
 Somaliland Armed Forces
 Ministry of Defence (Somaliland)
 List of Somalis
 Abdillahi Fadal Iman

References

People from Hargeisa
Somalian politicians
1967 births
Living people